Yermi Kaplan (born September 3, 1961 as Jeremy David Kaplan) is an Israeli American musician.

Biography
Jeremy David Kaplan was born in Chicago on September 3, 1961, to television director Irving Kaplan and Orah Rivlin Kaplan. He immigrated with his family to Israel in 1969, and acted in a number of television and film roles in his childhood, including the Israeli English instruction program "Neighbors," and Operation Thunderbolt.
During his studies at Alliance High School in Tel Aviv, Kaplan was drummer in Rami Kleinstein's band Solar Eclipse.

References

1961 births
Living people
American emigrants to Israel